Events in the year 2001 in Germany.

Incumbents
President – Johannes Rau 
Chancellor – Gerhard Schröder

Events 
 7–18 February - 51st Berlin International Film Festival
 2 March - Germany in the Eurovision Song Contest 2001
 25 March - Baden-Württemberg state election, 2001
 25 March -Rhineland-Palatinate state election, 2001
 13 August - Arena AufSchalke in Gelsenkirchen is opened.
 23 September - Hamburg state election, 2001
 21 October -Berlin state election, 2001
 Date unknown: German company ZF Sachs was sold to ZF Friedrichshafen AG, and renamed to ZF Sachs AG.

Deaths

14 January - Burkhard Heim, German theoretical physicist (born 1925)
31 January - Heinz Starke, German politician (born 1911)
28 March - Günther Treptow, German opera singer (born 1907)
26 April - Ruth Hellberg, German actress (born 1906)
25 June - Kurt Hoffmann, German film director (born 1910)
5 July - Hannelore Kohl, German first wife of German Chancellor Helmut Kohl (born 1933)
8 July - Ernst Baier, German figure skater (born 1905)
31 July - Friedrich Franz, Hereditary Grand Duke of Mecklenburg-Schwerin (born 1910)
20 September - Karl-Eduard von Schnitzler, German journalist (born 1918)
23 November - Gerhard Stoltenberg, German politician (born 1928)

See also
2001 in German television

References

 
Years of the 21st century in Germany
2000s in Germany
Germany
Germany